Noel Myles (born 1947 in London) is an English artist who works with the still photographic image, extending it beyond the single moment and static viewpoint. He was born in London in 1947 and lives and practices in Sudbury, Suffolk. He is most known for his large-scale collages composed of small individual photographs, taken from various view points and at different times, which when joined together make up a larger image.

More details of Myles' work can be found at Reframing Photography.

Biography and work

Myles studied fine art at the Hornsey and Walthamstow School of Art between 1966 and 1970. From the 1980s on, Myles begun using etching techniques and produced a series of drawings in Cornwall of the sea and cliffs, some of which were shown at the Royal Academy. It was following this period that the artist began to experiment with photography. A chance encounter with an exhibition of 19th Century photography at the Royal Academy of Arts captivated the artist with its ‘delicate, tactile qualities’. Later, the artist received a grant from the University of East London to research Victorian printing processes including Platinum prints. Myles had issues with the way in which photography had come to represent reality as ‘decisive moments,’ as photographer Henri Cartier-Bresson sought to capture. The artist started to explore different ways of capturing the ways that the human mind perceives events, and likewise, the way that memories are constructed. David Hockney had previously pioneered the joiner technique of forming an image of a series of individual photographs and Myles started to use a similar technique in his work. He was awarded first prize in the Bradford Challenge at the NMPFT by David Hockney in 1987. 
 
Myles experimented with Cyanotypes and Platinum prints. When asked why he used platinum prints he responded ‘‘it was the most expensive, the most beautiful, the most traditional, the highest form of photographic print making that's ever been devised."

Many of Myles’ photographs are of the countryside in eastern England. He works on collages often made up of hundreds of 35mm negatives. He also explores the space between still photography and film calling a series of his images Still Films. Another collage by Myles, The Dragon Spirit, was made from a selection of 3,000 images that Myles took with a Nikon camera, with the final image being made from 300–400 of these pictures. He took over 12,000 photographs for the two commissions for ITN.

Myles’ ideas about his work and photography have been expressed by the artist himself:

“The challenge I faced with photography was that the instantaneous static viewpoint, provided by the camera’s lens and shutter, didn’t represent the continuous flow of the act of looking. It seemed as if the single-frame photograph had been held back to the level of the dictionary; the single word. It was the visual equivalent of overlooking the potential to link words to convey ideas and meaning. I couldn’t accept the notion of an isolated, decisive moment being capable of encapsulating our experience of life.”

Myles considers himself foremost a photographer but seeks to challenge some of the assumptions made about photography as an effective means to represent reality. He draws influence from painting using the texture, line, tone and colour as a painter would use brush strokes. He has described the process as "a question of pulling things together [and] harmonising them." Part of Myles' process involves photographing the same scene or location multiple times at various times of day. This creates a layering of times in a single image. Myles uses long exposure photography, telephoto lenses and blur to create his desired effect emulating brush strokes.

Myles has exhibited at various locations and has been resident artist three times.  Myles was artist in residence at ITN studios between Oct 1995 and 1996, Rowe and Maw in 1987 and 1995, and Shaftesbury PLC 1995.

Selected exhibitions

Altered State, Float. Showcase, 2018
Earth, Sainsbury Centre for Visual Arts, 2013
Between Photography, The Minories, Colchester, 2013
Gainsborough's House, 2012
V & A, 2008
Stephanie Hoppen Gallery, London, 2003
Zelda Cheatle Gallery, London, 2001
L’Oeil Ecoute, Limoges, France, 1999
Gainsborough's House, 1999
The Gallery in Cork St, London, UK, 1995
The Royal Photographic Society on three occasions
National Museum of Photography, Film and Television; 1st prize winner Bradford Challenge, 1987
National Portrait Gallery, London, 1986
Serpentine, 1976
Royal College of Art: Prizewinner London Group
Royal Academy of Art on several occasions
Contemporary Art Society
Maison Du Limousin, Paris
Mall Galleries: Prizewinner Discerning Eye
Clare Hall, Cambridge
Alison Richard Building, Cambridge

Artist in Residence 

 Artist in residence for ITN on two occasions
Shaftesbury plc in Chinatown
 Rowe and Maw on two occasions

References

English artists
1947 births
Living people